Howlite, a calcium borosilicate hydroxide (Ca2B5SiO9(OH)5), is a borate mineral found in evaporite deposits.

History 
Howlite was discovered near Windsor, Nova Scotia, in 1868 by Henry How (1828–1879), a Canadian chemist, geologist, and mineralogist.  How was alerted to the unknown mineral by miners in a gypsum quarry, who found it to be a nuisance.  He called the new mineral silico-boro-calcite; it was given the name howlite by the American geologist James Dwight Dana shortly thereafter.

Geology
The most common form of howlite is irregular nodules, sometimes resembling cauliflower.  Crystals of howlite are rare, having been found in only a couple localities worldwide.  Crystals were first reported from Tick Canyon in the Sierra Pelona Mountains of California, and later at Iona, Nova Scotia.  Crystals reach a maximum size of about one centimeter.  The nodules are white with fine grey or black veins in an erratic, often web-like pattern, opaque with a sub-vitreous luster. The crystals at Iona are colorless, white or brown and are often translucent or transparent.

Its structure is monoclinic with a Mohs hardness of 3.5 and lacks regular cleavage.  Crystals are prismatic and flattened on {100}.  The crystals from Tick Canyon are elongated along the 010 axis, while those from Iona are elongated along the 001 axis.

Jewelry
Howlite is commonly used to make decorative objects such as small carvings or jewelry components. Because of its porous texture, howlite can be easily dyed to imitate other minerals, especially turquoise because of the superficial similarity of the veining patterns. Howlite is also sold in its natural state, sometimes under the trade names of "white turquoise" or "white buffalo turquoise," or the derived name "white buffalo stone" and is used to produce jewelry similar to how turquoise is used. Varieties of the unrelated gemstone turquoise which are white instead of the typical blue or green color have been mined in the US States of Arizona and Nevada, and are also marketed as "white buffalo turquoise".  Most of the white varieties of turquoise are chalk-like with a Mohs hardness of 1, and are not as hard or durable as howlite, and subsequently require stabilization in order to be used in jewelry, which has resulted in howlite being more popular for use in jewelry than the artificially stabilized white forms of the mineral turquoise.

Gallery

See also
List of minerals
List of minerals named after people
Borate minerals

References

Bibliography
Palache, P.; Berman H.; Frondel, C. (1960). "Dana's System of Mineralogy, Volume II: Halides, Nitrates, Borates, Carbonates, Sulfates, Phosphates, Arsenates, Tungstates, Molybdates, Etc. (Seventh Edition)" John Wiley and Sons, Inc., New York, pp. 362-363.

Inoborates
Monoclinic minerals
Minerals in space group 14